is a hentai anime created by Abogato Powers and released in 2001.

Plot
Private detective Satoshi Suzuhara and his adoptive daughter, Asuka Kashiwagi, are spending time at an isolated ski resort. But when a snowstorm cuts off all links to the outside, Satoshi becomes the main suspect as a string of gruesome murders are being done on the guests at the now cut-off resort. It becomes a race against time as Satoshi must find out who is behind the murders.

H. P. Lovecraft

The story is heavily inspired by the writings of noted horror author, H. P. Lovecraft, including references to not only the Necronomicon, a book of his creation, but to Miskatonic University, Abdul Alhazred, and other Lovecraft characters. The main villain is, in fact, Herbert West, the central character of Lovecraft's "Herbert West–Reanimator". The plot includes many Lovecraftian tropes, including mad scientists, ancient rituals, dream interpretation, and a private investigator protagonist. The grand finale takes place on Walpurgis Night, the night of sacrifice in Lovecraft's "The Dreams in the Witch House".

External links 
 
  (Debatable source)
 

2001 anime OVAs
Anime 18
Hentai anime and manga
Horror anime and manga
Occult detective anime and manga
Cthulhu Mythos stories
NEC PC-9801 games
Sega Saturn games
Zombies in anime and manga